"Grow Old with Me" is a song by British singer-songwriter Tom Odell. The track was released in the United Kingdom on 13 September 2013 as the fourth single from Odell's debut studio album, Long Way Down (2013). It was also featured in the Reign episode "Dirty Laundry" (S1 E14).

Track listing

Charts

Certifications

References

Tom Odell songs
2012 songs
2013 singles
Songs written by Tom Odell
Columbia Records singles